Stoneleigh is a locality in the Toowoomba Region, Queensland, Australia.

Geography 
The terrain is hilly with two named peaks: Parkers  and Parkers Hill . The land use is predominantly agricultural involving both cropping and grazing.

History 
Stoneleigh Provisional School opened in 1906, becoming Stoneleigh State School on 1 Jan 1909. It closed in 1919.

In July 1935, local farmer Victor George Hawkes of Turallin shot and killed his wife, his two children and his father-in-law before shooting and killing himself. He had started a fire to try to make it appear to be an accident. He had purchased the rifle earlier that day claiming he needed it to shoot wild cats. It was suggested he acted when in unsound mind, noting his depression from financial losses due to the drought and that he had been severely gassed and shellshocked during World War I.

Education 
There are no schools in Stoneleigh but primary and secondary schools are available in neighbouring Pittsworth.

References 

Toowoomba Region
Localities in Queensland